Erich Fuchs (27 June 1925 – 26 July 2014) was a German sprinter. He competed in the men's 100 metres at the 1952 Summer Olympics.

Competition record

References

1925 births
2014 deaths
Athletes (track and field) at the 1952 Summer Olympics
German male sprinters
Olympic athletes of Germany
Place of birth missing